Yo, también  is a 2009 Spanish drama film. It shows the life of Daniel with Down Syndrome and his friendship with Laura. Daniel's role has been played by Pablo Pineda, who has Down Syndrome in real life.

Cast 
 Pablo Pineda as Daniel
 Lola Duenas as Laura Valiente
 Isabel Garcia Lorca as Ma Angeles
 Antonio Naharro as Santi
 Pedro Alvarez-Ossorio as Bernabe

Accolades

See also 
 List of Spanish films of 2009

References

External links 
 

2009 films
Spanish drama films
2009 drama films
2000s Spanish films
Down syndrome in film
2000s Spanish-language films
Films about disability